The Christian Council of Ghana (CCG) is an umbrella group that unites 31 churches and denominations in Ghana. The council has its members from Charismatic, Pentecostal, Orthodox and other churches.

History of the Council
The CCG was formed on 30 October 1929. Five churches, namely:
African Methodist Episcopal (AME),
Zion Church, English Church Mission (Anglican),
Evangelical Presbyterian Church, Ghana (then the Ewe Presbyterian Church),
Presbyterian Church of the Gold Coast (now Presbyterian Church of Ghana), and
the Methodist Church Ghana (then the Wesleyan Methodist Church)
united aiming to work with various congregations on social matters and to speak for the voiceless in society.

Membership of the council
The council  has been restructured several times since its formation. It currently includes 29 churches and two Christian organizations.

Current Membership

The Methodist Church Ghana 
Presbyterian Church of Ghana 
Evangelical Presbyterian Church, Ghana 
The Salvation Army 
African Methodist Episcopal Zion Church 
Christian Methodist Episcopal Church 
African Methodist Episcopal Church 
EDEN Revival Church 
Ghana Baptist Convention 
Evangelical Lutheran Church 
Religious Society of Friends 
Ghana Mennonite Church 
Greek Orthodox Church 
Christ Evangelical Mission 
Evangelical Church of Ghana 
Fellowship of Christian Churches
YMCA
Young Women’s Christian Association
Legon Interdenominational Church
Anglican Diocese of Accra
The Luke Society
Ghana Evangelical Convention
Accra Ridge Church
Tema Joint Church
Teshie/Nungua United Church
Atomic Hills United Church
Ghana Police Church
Winners Chapel Ghana

Organizations
YMCA
Young Women’s Christian Association

Projects
The council undertakes various projects in Ghana. One of its major goals is the elimination of stigma and discrimination of people living with HIV/AIDS. The project trained community members in areas of the country that had high HIV/AIDS prevalence of 8–9%. The training involved basic facts about HIV/AIDS, stigma and discrimination among others.

The council has also set up an Interfaith Unit to educate Christians on the need for peaceful existence and tolerance among members of different faiths. The School Dropout Scholarship Programme promotes education among Liberian refugees in the Buduburam refugee settlement near Accra. The programme also identifies the causes and consequences of school dropout among the refugees.

In governance and nation building, the council monitors the activities of political parties and professional bodies in the country and offers advice to them. In 2005 the council appealed to Ghanaians and professional bodies to put the country's economy nation first and spend more time discussing issues of national interest concerning education, health and poverty. In 2011 the council encouraged political party leaders and their followers to avoid the use of provocative language in their speeches.

References

Christianity in Ghana